The Huawei Ascend W1 is Huawei's first device to run Windows Phone 8. It was announced at the 2013 Consumer Electronics Show (CES). It was released in January 2013 as the least expensive Windows Phone in the Chinese market.

Because of the limited memory available on this phone, certain applications and features will not be able to run.

For African markets, the phone is named as "Huawei 4Afrika" as part of Microsoft's 4Afrika Initiative.

References

External links
 
 

W1
Windows Phone devices
Videotelephony
Mobile phones introduced in 2013
Discontinued smartphones